Ardatovsky District is an administrative district (raion), one of the forty in Nizhny Novgorod Oblast, Russia. Municipally, it is incorporated as Ardatovsky Municipal District. It is located in the southwest of the oblast. Its administrative center is the urban locality (a work settlement) of Ardatov. Population: 26,428 (2010 Census);  The population of Ardatov accounts for 36.2% of the district's total population.

History
The district was established in 1929.

References

Notes

Sources

Districts of Nizhny Novgorod Oblast
States and territories established in 1929
Ardatovsky District, Nizhny Novgorod Oblast
